Vizianagaram revenue division (or Vizianagaram division) is an administrative division in the Vizianagaram district of the Indian state of Andhra Pradesh. It is one of the three revenue divisions in the district with ten mandals under its administration. The divisional headquarters are located at Vizianagaram.

Mandals 
The 11 mandals administered under the revenue division are:

See also 
List of revenue divisions in Andhra Pradesh
List of mandals in Andhra Pradesh

References 

Revenue divisions in Vizianagaram district